Thomas Guthrie Wright WS FRSE FSA(Scot) (1777–1849) was a Scottish lawyer and antiquarian.

Life

He was born in Edinburgh in 1777 the son of Charles Wright a stationer and bookseller living and trading from Parliament Square on the Royal Mile.

He trained as a lawyer in at Edinburgh and qualified as a Writer to the Signet in 1802. From 1806 until death he was Auditor to the Court of Session in the Edinburgh courts.

In 1820 he was elected a Fellow of the Royal Society of Edinburgh. His proposers were Sir David Brewster, Thomas Allan and Joshua Henry Davidson . At this time he was living at 2 Charlotte Square, a magnificent townhouse by Robert Adam.

In 1830 he was living at 6 St Colme Street on the fashionable Moray Estate in Edinburgh's West End.

He died in Paris on 1 September 1849 and is buried in the prestigious Pere La Chaise Cemetery in the north-east of the city.

Publications

Family

In March 1809 he married Mary Hill (d.1857) daughter of John Hill.

References

1777 births
1849 deaths
Lawyers from Edinburgh
Scottish antiquarians
Scottish lawyers
Fellows of the Royal Society of Edinburgh
Burials at Père Lachaise Cemetery